Murodjon Kakharovich Akhmadaliev (born 2 November 1994) is an Uzbekistani professional boxer who is a unified super-bantamweight champion, having held the WBA (Super), and IBF titles since 2020. As an amateur, he won a silver medal at the 2015 World Championships and bronze at the 2016 Olympics as a bantamweight. As of April 2021, he is ranked as the world's best active super-bantamweight by The Ring, fourth by BoxRec and second best by the Transnational Boxing Rankings Board.

Amateur career

Olympic result
Rio 2016
Round of 16: Defeated Kairat Yeraliyev (Kazakhstan) 3–0
Quarter-finals: Defeated Alberto Melián (Argentina) TKO
Semi-finals: Defeated by Robeisy Ramírez (Cuba) 3–0

Professional career

Early career
On 10 March 2018, Akhmadaliev made his professional debut against David Michel Paz of Argentina. Akhmadaliev won the bout via knockout in the opening round after his opponent was unable to recover from a body shot. Akhmadaliev fought for a second time professionally on 21 April 2018 against Carlos Gaston Suarez. Akhmadaliev won via technical knockout after hitting his opponent with several unanswered shots in the fourth round.

On 14 July 2018, Akhmadaliev defeated the durable Luis Fernando Molina on route to a unanimous points decision win. Akhmadaliev’s fourth professional fight was against Ramon Contreras on 23 August 2018. In the opening round, Akhmadaliev put his opponent on the canvas after he landed a heavy left hand to the body. Referee Thomas Taylor proceeded to end the bout after Contreras was unable to beat the ten count. Akhmadaliev fought against Issac Zarate on 24 November 2018. Akhmadaliev hurt Zarate a number of times throughout the bout after landing a series of heavy punches and in the ninth round, Akhmadaliev landed several hard blows to the head of Zarate which forced referee Eric Dali to end the bout.

On 25 April 2019, it was announced that Akhmadaliev had signed a contract with Matchroom Sport where he would be promoted by Eddie Hearn. On 26 April 2019 Akhmadaliev fought against Carlos Carlson, in the third round Akhmadaliev put his opponent on the canvas after landing a heavy right hand to the head of Carlson. Referee Jerry Cantu immediately stopped the bout. On 13 September 2019, Akhmadaliev beat Wilner Soto by technical knockout after landing several unanswered punches.

Unified Super Bantamweight champion

Akhmadaliev vs. Roman
On 11 December 2019, it was announced that Akhmadaliev would face unified WBA and IBF super-bantamweight champion Daniel Roman. The bout was initially due to take place on 13 September 2019 in New York City, however the fight was postponed after Roman suffered a shoulder injury during training camp. The fight was rescheduled to take place on 30 January 2020 at the Meridian at Island Gardens in Miami, Florida. Akhmadaliev defeated Roman via split decision to become Uzbekistan's first ever unified world champion. Two judges scored the bout 115–113 to Akhmadaliev while the third scored it 115–113 to Roman.

Akhmadaliev vs. Iwasa
It was revealed on January 11, 2021, by various Uzbek media outlets that Akhmadaliev was looking to defend his unified crown against the interim IBF champion Ryosuke Iwasa. DAZN later announced the bout for April 3, 2021, in Tashkent, Uzbekistan. Akhmadaliev was a -700 favorite heading into the bout, with most fight analysts predicting an Akhmadaliev stoppage victory. Akhmadaliev beat the veteran contender by a fifth-round knockout. He outstruck Iwasa by 109-36 in overall punches, landing nearly as many total punches and power shots in the fifth round alone as Iwasa landed in the entire fight. During the post-fight interview, Akhmadaliev stated his desire to fully unify at super bantamweight.

Akhmadaliev vs. Velasquez 
It was announced on October 4, 2021, that Akhmadaliev would make his third WBA and IBF title defense against the WBC-NABF super bantamweight titlist Ronny Rios. The bout was scheduled for the undercard of the Demetrius Andrade and Jason Quigley middleweight title fight, which will be held on November 19, 2021 at the SNHU Arena in Manchester, New Hampshire. Rios was later forced to withdraw from the bout due to a positive COVID-19 test. Akhmadaliev was rescheduled to face the #11 ranked WBO bantamweight Jose Velasquez at the same event. He entered the bout as a -600 favorite, with most odds-makers expecting a victory from the champion. Akhmadaliev won the fight by unanimous decision, losing only the seventh round, with all three judges awarding him a 119-109 scorecard. Akhmadaliev furthermore stated that he would like to honor his commitment against Ronny Rios.

Akhmadaliev vs. Rios
On January 4, 2022, Akhmadaliev was ordered by the IBF to make his fourth title defense against mandatory title challenger Marlon Tapales. Although the two camps were given until February 2 to iron out the terms of the bout, Tapales' representatives instead opted to forego the assigned negotiation period and head straight to a purse bid, which was scheduled by the IBF for January 18. The purse bid was postponed by a week on January 18, giving both parties seven days to come to terms. 

On January 24, 2022, Akhmaladiev was furthermore ordered by the WBA to make a mandatory title defense against Ronny Rios by May 24, 2021. The IBF and WBA came to agreement on January 28, which would see Akhmaladiev first make his mandatory WBA title defense against Rios and then his mandatory IBF title defense against Tapales. The title defense against Rios was officially announced for June 11, as the main event of a DAZN broadcast card taking place in San Antonio, Texas. Akhmaladiev won the fight by a twelfth-round technical knockout. He first knocked Rios down with a flurry of punches midway through the last round, and although Rios was able to beat the count, he was stopped with another flurry of punches soon afterward.

Akhmadaliev vs. Tapales
On September 18, 2022, the IBF ordered Akhmadaliev to face their mandatory super bantamweight title challenger Marlon Tapales. Tapales' team requested the bout to head to an immediate purse bid, after the fight was re-ordered on December 4. Although a purse bid was scheduled to take place on December 20, the IBF delayed it by two weeks at the request of both camps. The pair came to an agreement on January 3, 2023. The championship bout is scheduled to take place on April 8, 2023, at the Tech Port Arena in San Antonio, Texas.

Professional boxing record

References

External links
 
 
 
 
 
Murodjon Akhmadaliev - Profile, News Archive & Current Rankings at Box.Live

1994 births
Living people
People from Namangan Region
Uzbekistani male boxers
Olympic boxers of Uzbekistan
Boxers at the 2016 Summer Olympics
Medalists at the 2016 Summer Olympics
Olympic medalists in boxing
Olympic bronze medalists for Uzbekistan
Boxers at the 2014 Asian Games
Asian Games competitors for Uzbekistan
AIBA World Boxing Championships medalists
Bantamweight boxers
Super-bantamweight boxers
World Boxing Association champions
International Boxing Federation champions